|}

The Sun Chariot Stakes is a Group 1 flat horse race in Great Britain open to fillies and mares aged three years or older. It is run on the Rowley Mile at Newmarket over a distance of 1 mile (1,609 metres), and it is scheduled to take place each year in early October.

History
The event is named after Sun Chariot, the fillies' Triple Crown winner in 1942. Due to war, that year's Triple Crown races were all staged at Newmarket.

The Sun Chariot Stakes was established in 1966. It was originally contested by three-year-old fillies over 1 mile and 2 furlongs.

The present system of race grading was introduced in 1971, and the Sun Chariot Stakes was classed at Group 2 level. It was opened to older fillies and mares in 1974.

The race was cut to a mile in 2000, and promoted to Group 1 status in 2004.

The Sun Chariot Stakes was held on the final day of Newmarket's three-day Cambridgeshire Meeting, the same day as the Cambridgeshire Handicap, but was moved to a fixture a week later from 2014.

Records

Most successful horse (3 wins):
 Sahpresa – 2009, 2010, 2011

Leading jockey (6 wins):
 Lester Piggott – Popkins (1970), Cheveley Princess (1973), Swiss Maid (1978), Topsy (1979), Snow (1980), Home on the Range (1981)

Leading trainer (6 wins):
 Luca Cumani – Free Guest (1984, 1985), Infamy (1987), Red Slippers (1992), One So Wonderful (1997), Kissogram (1998)

Leading owner (3 wins):
 Budgie Moller – Popkins (1970), Cheveley Princess (1973), Topsy (1979)
 Sheikh Mohammed – Indian Skimmer (1988), Red Slippers (1992), La Confederation (1994)
 Tabor / Smith  / Magnier - Halfway To Heaven (2008), Alice Springs (2016), Roly Poly (2017)

Winners

See also
 Horse racing in Great Britain
 List of British flat horse races

References
 Paris-Turf: 
 Racing Post:

 galopp-sieger.de – Sun Chariot Stakes.
 horseracingintfed.com – International Federation of Horseracing Authorities – Sun Chariot Stakes (2018).
 pedigreequery.com – Sun Chariot Stakes – Newmarket.
 

Flat races in Great Britain
Newmarket Racecourse
Mile category horse races for fillies and mares
Recurring sporting events established in 1966
British Champions Series